Kim Eui-sung (born December 17, 1965) is a South Korean actor. He is known for his roles in films The Day a Pig Fell into the Well (1996), Office (2015), The Exclusive: Beat the Devil's Tattoo (2015) and Train to Busan (2016); and television series W (2016), and Taxi Driver (2021).

Selected filmography

Film

Television series

Web series

Awards and nominations

References

External links
 
 

1965 births
Living people
South Korean male television actors
South Korean male film actors
South Korean male web series actors
20th-century South Korean male actors
21st-century South Korean male actors
Best Supporting Actor Paeksang Arts Award (film) winners
Gimhae Kim clan